The Cockerel egg (also called the Cuckoo Clock egg) was crafted by Peter Carl Fabergé in his set of Imperial Fabergé eggs. The egg was given in the year 1900 by Tsar Nicholas II to Empress Maria Feodoronova as a gift. The egg has a mechanism on the top rear that enables its bird to come out and move.

The egg is part of the Viktor Vekselberg Collection, owned by The Link of Times Foundation, and housed in the Fabergé Museum in Saint Petersburg, Russia.

References

Sources

Imperial Fabergé eggs
1900 works
Fabergé clock eggs
Fabergé Museum in Saint Petersburg, Russia